This is a list of Swedish football transfers in the summer transfer window 2012 by club.

Only transfers in and out between 1–31 August 2012 of the Allsvenskan and Superettan are included.

Allsvenskan

AIK

In:

Out:

BK Häcken

In:

Out:

Djurgårdens IF

In:

Out:

GAIS

In:

Out:

Gefle IF

In:

Out:

GIF Sundsvall

In:

Out:

Helsingborgs IF

In:

Out:

IF Elfsborg

In:

Out:

IFK Göteborg

In:

Out:

IFK Norrköping

In:

Out:

Kalmar FF

In:

Out:

Malmö FF

In:

Out:

Mjällby AIF

In:

Out:

Syrianska FC

In:

Out:

Åtvidabergs FF

In:

Out:

Örebro SK

In:

Out:

Superettan

Assyriska FF

In:

Out:

Degefors IF

In:

Out:

Falkenbergs FF

In:

Out:

Halmstads BK

In:

Out:

Hammarby IF

In:

Out:

IF Brommapojkarna

In:

Out:

IFK Värnamo

In:

Out:

IK Brage

In:

Out:

Jönköpings Södra IF

In:

Out:

Landskrona BoIS

In:

Out:

Ljungskile SK

In:

Out:

Trelleborgs FF

In:

Out:

Umeå FC

In:

Out:

Varbergs BoIS

In:

Out:

Ängelholms FF

In:

Out:

Östers IF

In:

Out:

References

Allsvenskan references

Superettan references

External links
 Official site of the SvFF 

transfers
2012
Sweden